Moresville may refer to:
 Moresville, California, now called Feather Falls
 Moresville, New York now called Grand Gorge